+1 Records was founded in 2008 as a music management, publicity & marketing company. From 2014, +1 Records was distributed by Lyor Cohen's 300 Entertainment. In 2018, +1 Records partnered with Empire Distribution.

Artists
 Anna of the North
 Anna Shoemaker
 Argonaut & Wasp
 Bebi Monsuta
 Coast Modern
 is0kenny
 Japan, Man
 Lo Village
 Nate Husser
 Rejjie Snow
 Stevan

References

External links
 Official site of +1 Records
 Official Twitter of +1 Records

American record labels
Record labels established in 2008
American companies established in 2008